This is the discography for English heavy metal singer Blaze Bayley.

Wolfsbane 
 Studio albums
Live Fast, Die Fast (1989)
All Hell's Breaking Loose Down at Little Kathy Wilson's Place (Mini, 1990)
Down Fall The Good Guys (1991, remastered 2012)
Wolfsbane (1994)
Howling Mad Shithead – The Best of Wolfsbane (2010)
Did it for the Money (EP, 2011)
Wolfsbane Save the World (2012)

 EPs
The Lost Tapes: A Secret History (2012)
Rock! (EP, 2015)

 Compilation album
Lifestyles of the Broke and Obscure (2001)

 Live album
Massive Noise Injection (1993)

Iron Maiden 

 Studio albums
The X Factor (1995)
Virtual XI (1998)

 Compilation albums
Best of the Beast (1996)
Best of the 'B' Sides (2002)
Eddie's Archive (2002)
Edward the Great (2002, 2005)
Visions of the Beast (2003)

 Video games
Ed Hunter (1999)

Blaze 
 Studio albums
Silicon Messiah (2000)
Tenth Dimension (2002)
Blood & Belief (2004)

 Live albums
As Live as It Gets (2003)

Blaze Bayley 

 Studio albums

The Man Who Would Not Die (2008) Released on Ltd Ed vinyl December 2010
Promise and Terror (2010)
The King of Metal (2012)
Infinite Entanglement (2016)
Endure and Survive - Infinite Entanglement Part II (2017)
The Redemption of William Black - Infinite Entanglement Part III (2018)
War Within Me (2021)

 Live albums
The Night That Will Not Die (2009)
Live in Prague (2014)
Live in France (2019)
 Live in Czech (2020)

 Compilation albums
Best of (2008, available only through the band's official website)
Soundtracks of my life (2013)

 Singles
"Robot" (2008, available only through the band's official website)

 DVDs
Alive in Poland (2007)
The Night That Will Not Die (2009)
Live in Prague (2014)
Live in France (2019)

Christmas Songs 
Rock 'n' Roll Christmas Featuring Mice Sciarrotta on Guitars (acoustic) (2013)
It's a Long Way Home This Christmas Featuring Mice Sciarrotta on Guitars (acoustic) & Emily Pembridge on Keyboards (2014)
 Crazy Christmas Featuring Mice Sciarrotta on Guitars (acoustic) and his band Absolva (2016)

Blaze Bayley and Thomas Zwijsen 
 Acoustic albums
December Wind (2018)
 Acoustic EPs
Russian Holiday (2013)

Blaze Bayley and John Steel 
 Studio albums
Freedom (2014)

Video clips 
Promotional videos were released for the Blood and Belief song "Hollow Head" and the Silicon Messiah song "Ghost in the Machine", but these were originally only made available to fan club members. Later on, the video for "Silicon Messiah" was put on to the second disc of a limited edition of Tenth Dimension along with an EPK titled Inside the Tenth Dimension. The video of "Hollow Head" was only made available worldwide in 2007 and can be found on the Alive in Poland DVD under the "Extras" menu. The video of "Robot" was also released in February 2009. An official video of "Russian Holyday" has been published on YouTube in 2013. In late 2013 two videos have been published via YouTube for the upcoming Best Of "Soundtracks of my life": "Hatred" and "Eating Children". In 2016 a videoclip for "Human" is released for launching the "Infinite Entanglement" album.

Unreleased songs 
"Death of a Singer" and "Sin by Sin" were songs that were played live during the Blaze-era. While "Death of a Singer" contains elements that were later used on the Blaze Bayley-song "Dimebag", "Sin by Sin" remains unreleased and has probably never been recorded in studio.

Guest appearances
Cerebral Fix – Bastards (1991, vocals on "Smash It Up")
The Almighty – Powertrippin''' (1993, background vocals on "Jesus Loves You ... But I Don't")Armageddon over Wacken Live 2004 (CD/DVD, 2005, with Doro)
Doro – Classic Diamonds - The DVD (2004, lead vocals on "Fear of the Dark")
Doro – 20 Years A Warrior Soul (2006, sharing vocals on "Bad Blood" and "All We Are")
Dragonsclaw – Prophecy (2011) (vocals on "Prophecy is a Lie")
Trooper - "Vodoo" (2011) (additional vocals)
Seven - "Freedom Call" (2011) (vocals)
Lonewolf – Army of the Damned (2012) (vocals on "The One You Never See")
Trooper – Mercy Killer (2012) (vocals on "Mercy Killer")
Sinnergod – vocals on "It's A Wonderful Life" (Single) (2012)
SoulSpell – Hollow's Gathering (2012) - vocals as "Banneth"
Ouijabeard – Die and let live (2012) - vocals on "Die and let live"
Thomas Zwijsen – Nylon Maiden (2012, vocals on "The Clansman")
Vessel – Introspective (2012, vocals on five tracks)
Chris Declercq – vocals on "A Miracle away" (Digital single) (2012)
A Sound of Thunder – Time's Arrow (2013) (vocals on "My Disease")
Ghostshift – Is My Enemy (2013) (vocals on "Short Days Ago")
Grimskull – Iron Eyes (single) (2013) (vocals on "Iron Eyes")
Wolfpakk – Cry Wolf (2013) (vocals on "Cry Wolf")
Guido Campiglio – vocals on "Prisoner" (single) (2013)
Genghis Khan – Genghis Khan was a rocker (2013, vocals on "Revenge in the Shadows")
Lehmann – Lehmanized (2013) (vocals on "Laid so low")
Alekseyevskaya Ploshchad – "Hero" (digital single, 2013)
Black Horizon – unreleased
John Steel - "Freedom" (2014) (vocals on seven tracks)
Shadow Legacy – You're Going Straight To Hell (2014) (vocals on "Hate Within")
Herot - Hellucination (2014) (vocals on "Time Machine")
Thomas Zwijsen - Nylonized (2014)
Pino Scotto – Vuoti di memoria (vocals on "Stone Dead Forever") (2014)
Vin Sinners – "A Mighty Black Box" - (vocals on "Open The Box") (2014)
Zix – "Tides of the Final War" - (vocals on "Metal Strike") (2016)
Savage Wizdom – "A New Beginning" - (vocals on "Let It Go") (2014)
Thundermaker – "Judgement and Order" (single) (2014)
Steve Foglia – "Steve in Wonderland" - (vocals on "Fight For Justice") (2014)
Maiden uniteD – "Remembrance" (2015) (vocals on "Futureal")
Adamas – "Heavy Thoughts" (2015) (vocals on "Heavy Thoughts")
SoulSpell - We Got The Right (Helloween 30 Years Tribute) (2015)
"Grossmann presents: Music From the Graphic Novel 'Cadeia'" (soundtrack, 2015)
 Not Over Yet -  "Back To Square One" (single) (2015)
 Enio Nicolini - "Heavy Sharing" (2015) (vocals on "King On Icy Throne")
 Cage - "Ancient Evil" (2015) (narration)
Doro – Strong and Proud'' (2016, sharing vocals on "Fear of the Dark" live)
 Cris Martins' Rock Dawn - "Witches Tower" - (vocals on three tracks) (2016)
 Gandalf's Fist - "The Clockwork Fable" (2016) (vocals on "At the Sign of the Aperture")
Operation: Mindcrime - "Resurrection" (2016) (vocals on "Taking on the World")
Ibridoma - "December" (2016) vocals on ("Land of Flames")
Mindghost - "The Anti-Citizen" (2016) (vocals on "My Last Breath")
Gaelbah - "Haxan" (2016) (vocals on "Black Widow")
Thomas Zwijsen - Nylonized: Preserved in Time (2016) (vocals on "Judgement of Heaven")
Art X - "The Redemption of Cain" (2016) (vocals on "Knowledge and Death")
Memorain - "Duality of Men" (2016) (vocals on "Last of Light")
Stage of Reality - Stage of Reality (2017) (vocals on "Warlord")
Hyperdump - "The Weak Man" (2017) (vocals on "No More")
Europica - "Part One" (2017) (vocals on "Unflagging" and "Powder Dry")

References 

Discographies of British artists
Heavy metal discographies